The Twistesee is a reservoir on the Twiste in the county of Waldeck-Frankenberg in North Hesse, Germany.

Location 
The Twistesee is located at the northern end of the Langer Wald around 30 km as the crow flies west-northwest of Kassel between Bad Arolsen in the west, Volkmarsen to the northeast and Wolfhagen to the southeast. The reason for its construction was the so-called Henry Flood (Heinrichsflut) on 16/17 July 1965 that caused serious damage and destruction in the catchment areas of the Twiste and Diemel rivers. Near one riverside village, Wetterburg, the Twiste was impounded by a dam to form a very large flood retention basin in order to control the water level.

Sights 
Among the sights in the vicinity of the Twistesee are: 
 Bad Arolsen, the best known destination near the reservoir.
 Neu-Berich, a village with an interesting past, near the lake.
 Landau, somewhat southeast of the reservoir, has an historical old town which is entirely protected, a palace, an historical town church and the Landauer Wasserkunst, an historical water supply system. 
 Near Volkhardinghausen, not far south of the reservoir, stands the French Oak (Franzoseneiche).

References

External links 
 Private website on the Twistesee

Literature 
 Peter Franke, Wolfgang Frey: Talsperren in der Bundesrepublik Deutschland. DNK – DVWK 1987,

See also 
 List of dams in Germany

Buildings and structures completed in 1981
Reservoirs in Hesse
RTwistesee
Waldeck-Frankenberg